(née ,  ; 1788–1865) was a Russian writer, known especially for her books on homemaking and collections of Russian folk tales. She was a sister of Nikolai Polevoy and Ksenofont Polevoy. In 1837 she published a book called Notes and remarks about Siberia.

References

1788 births
1865 deaths
Women writers from the Russian Empire
19th-century writers from the Russian Empire
Russian food writers
19th-century women writers from the Russian Empire